Džepište is a village in the municipality of Debar, North Macedonia.

History
In 1913 the village, along with other settlements on the left bank of the Black Drin, were assigned to Independent Albania. The village was part of the Principality of Albania from 1914-1925 and the Albanian Republic in 1925. It was ceded to the Kingdom of Serbs, Croats and Slovenes on 30 July 1925 by Ahmet Zogu.

Demographics
Džepište has traditionally been inhabited by Orthodox Macedonians and Muslim Macedonians.

As of the 2021 census, Džepište had 347 residents with the following ethnic composition:
Turks 181
Albanians 75 
Macedonians 45
Others (including Torbeš) 24
Persons for whom data are taken from administrative sources 22

According to the 2002 census, the village had a total of 499 inhabitants. Ethnic groups in the village include:
Turks 276
Macedonians 105
Albanians 96
Others 22

References

External links

Villages in Debar Municipality
Macedonian Muslim villages
Albanian communities in North Macedonia